The Table tennis competition at the 2006 Central American and Caribbean Games was held in Cartagena, Colombia. The tournament was held from 22–30 July.

Medal summary

Men's events

Women's events

Mixed events

References

External links

2006 Central American and Caribbean Games
2006 in table tennis
2006